Pamulaparthi Venkata Narasimha Rao (28 June 1921 – 23 December 2004), popularly known as P. V. Narasimha Rao, was an Indian lawyer, statesman and politician who served as the 9th prime minister of India from 1991 to 1996. He is known for introducing various liberal reforms to India's economy. His ascendancy to the prime ministership was politically significant because he was the second holder of this office from a non-Hindi-speaking region and the first from South India (United Andhra Pradesh). He led an important administration, overseeing a major economic transformation and several home incidents affecting national security of India. Rao, who held the Industries portfolio, was personally responsible for the dismantling of the Licence Raj, as this came under the purview of the Ministry of Commerce and Industry, reversing the economic policies of Rajiv Gandhi's government. 

Former Prime Minister Manmohan Singh described Rao as the true father of economic reforms in India. In 1991, Rao employed Manmohan Singh as his finance minister to embark on historic economic transition. With Rao's mandate, Manmohan Singh launched India's globalisation angle of the reforms that implemented the International Monetary Fund (IMF) policies to rescue the almost bankrupt nation from economic collapse. Rao was also referred to as Chanakya for his ability to steer economic and political legislation through the parliament at a time when he headed a minority government. 11th president of India, APJ Abdul Kalam described Rao as a "patriotic statesman who believed that the nation is bigger than the political system". Kalam acknowledged that Rao, had in fact, asked him to get ready for testing nuclear weapons in 1996, but they were not carried out, due to the change of government pursuant to the 
1996 Indian general election. The Vajpayee-led NDA government later conducted the nuclear tests  in 1998. It emerged later, that Rao had briefed Vajpayee on the state of readiness for nuclear tests, paving the way for this decision. Future prime ministers Atal Bihari Vajpayee and Manmohan Singh continued the economic reform policies pioneered by Rao's government.

Rao's term as prime minister was an eventful one in India's history. Besides marking a paradigm shift from the industrialising, mixed economic model of Jawaharlal Nehru to a market driven one, his years as prime minister also saw the emergence of the Bharatiya Janata Party (BJP), a major right-wing party, as an alternative to the Indian National Congress which had been governing India for most of its post-independence history. Rao died in 2004 of a heart attack in New Delhi. He was cremated in Hyderabad. 

He was a versatile thinker with interests in a variety of subjects (other than politics) such as literature and computer software (including computer programming). He spoke 17 languages. Although he was also criticised during his tenure and even sidelined later by his own party, retrospective evaluations have been kinder, even positioning him as one of the best prime ministers of India in various polls and analyses. His achievements include steering India through the 1991 economic crisis, completing a tenure with a minority government, establishing diplomatic relations with Israel, starting India's Look East policy, rekindling India's nuclear programme, defeating the 1994 United Nations resolution against India, effectively handling and crushing insurgency in Punjab, tough policy against terrorism in Kashmir, and opening partial diplomatic relations with Taiwan.

Early life
P. V. Narasimha Rao was born on 28 June 1921 in a Telugu Niyogi Brahmin family in the village of Laknepalli village of Narsampet mandal, Warangal district of present-day Telangana (then part of Hyderabad State). His father Sitarama Rao and mother Rukma Bai hailed from agrarian families. Later he was adopted by Pamulaparthi Ranga Rao and Rukminamma and brought to Vangara, a village in Bheemadevarpalle mandal of present-day Hanamkonda district in Telangana when he was three years old. Popularly known as P. V., he completed part of his primary education in Katkuru village of Bheemdevarapalli mandal in Hanamkonda district by staying in his relative Gabbeta Radhakishan Rao's house and studying for his bachelor's degree in the Arts college at the Osmania University. P. V. Narasimha Rao was part of Vande Mataram movement in the late 1930s in the Hyderabad State. He later went on to Hislop College, now under Nagpur University, where he completed a master's degree in law. He completed his law from Fergusson College in Pune of the University of Bombay (now Mumbai).

Along with his distant cousin Pamulaparthi Sadasiva Rao, Ch. Raja Narendra and Devulapalli Damodar Rao, P. V. edited a Telugu weekly magazine called Kakatiya Patrika in the 1940s. Both P. V. and Sadasiva Rao contributed articles under the pen-name Jaya-Vijaya. He served as the Chairman of the Telugu Academy in Andhra Pradesh from 1968 to 1974.

Political career

Rao was an active freedom fighter during the Indian Independence movement and joined full-time politics after independence as a member of the Indian National Congress. He served as an elected representative for Andhra Pradesh State Assembly from 1957 to 1977. He served in various ministerial positions in Andhra government from 1962 to 1973. He became the Chief minister of Andhra Pradesh in 1971 and implemented land reforms and land ceiling acts strictly. He secured reservation for lower castes in politics during his tenure. President's rule had to be imposed to counter the Jai Andhra movement during his tenure.

He supported Indira Gandhi in formation of New Congress party in 1969 by splitting the Indian National Congress. This was later regrouped as Congress (I) party in 1978. He served as Member of Parliament, Lok Sabha from Andhra Pradesh. He rose to national prominence for handling several diverse portfolios, most significantly Home, Defence and Foreign Affairs, in the cabinets of both Indira Gandhi and Rajiv Gandhi. He served as Foreign minister from 1980 to 1984 and then from 1988 to 1989. In fact, it is speculated that he was in the running for the post of India's President along with Zail Singh in 1982.

Rao very nearly retired from politics in 1991. He was Indian National Congress President  from 29 May' 1991- Sept.1996. It was the assassination of the Congress President Rajiv Gandhi that persuaded him to make a comeback. As the Congress had won the largest number of seats in the 1991 elections, he had an opportunity to head the minority government as Prime Minister. He was the first person outside the Nehru–Gandhi family to serve as Prime Minister for five continuous years, the first to hail from the State of Andhra Pradesh, and also the first from Southern India. Since Rao had not contested the general elections, he then participated in a by-election in Nandyal to join the parliament. Rao won from Nandyal with a victory margin of a record 5 lakh (500,000) votes and his win was recorded in the Guinness Book Of World Records; later on, in 1996, he was MP from Berhampur, Ganjam District, Odisha. His cabinet included Sharad Pawar, himself a strong contender for the Prime Minister's post, as Defence Minister. He also broke a convention by appointing a non-political economist and future prime minister, Manmohan Singh as his Finance Minister. He also appointed Subramanian Swamy, an opposition party member as the Chairman of the Commission on Labour Standards and International Trade. This has been the only instance that an opposition party member was given a Cabinet rank post by the ruling party. He also sent opposition leader Atal Bihari Vajpayee, to represent India in a UN meeting at Geneva.

Narasimha Rao fought and won elections from different parts of India such as Andhra Pradesh, Maharashtra and Odisha.

Prime minister (1991-1996)

Economic reforms

Adopted to avert the impending 1991 economic crisis, the reforms progressed furthest in the areas of opening up to foreign investment, reforming capital markets, deregulating domestic business, and reforming the trade regime. Rao's government's goals were reducing the fiscal deficit, privatisation of the public sector and increasing investment in infrastructure. Trade reforms and changes in the regulation of foreign direct investment were introduced to open India to foreign trade while stabilising external loans. Rao wanted I. G. Patel as his Finance Minister. Patel was an official who helped prepare 14 budgets, an ex-governor of the Reserve Bank of India and had headed The London School of Economics. But Patel declined. Rao then chose Manmohan Singh for the job. Manmohan Singh, an acclaimed economist, played a central role in implementing these reforms. 

Major reforms in India's capital markets led to an influx of foreign portfolio investment. The major economic policies adopted by Rao include:
Abolishing in 1992 the Controller of Capital Issues which decided the prices and number of shares that firms could issue.
Introducing the SEBI Act of 1992 and the Security Laws (Amendment) which gave SEBI the legal authority to register and regulate all security market intermediaries.
Opening up in 1992 of India's equity markets to investment by foreign institutional investors and permitting Indian firms to raise capital on international markets by issuing Global Depository Receipts (GDRs).
Starting in 1994 of the National Stock Exchange as a computer-based trading system which served as an instrument to leverage reforms of India's other stock exchanges. The NSE emerged as India's largest exchange by 1996.
Reducing tariffs from an average of 85 per cent to 25 per cent, and rolling back quantitative controls. (The rupee was made convertible on trade account.)
Encouraging foreign direct investment by increasing the maximum limit on share of foreign capital in joint ventures from 40 to 51% with 100% foreign equity permitted in priority sectors.
Streamlining procedures for FDI approvals, and in at least 35 industries, automatically approving projects within the limits for foreign participation.

The impact of these reforms may be gauged from the fact that total foreign investment (including foreign direct investment, portfolio investment, and investment raised on international capital markets) in India grew from a minuscule US$132 million in 1991–92 to $5.3 billion in 1995–96. Rao began industrial policy reforms with the manufacturing sector. He slashed industrial licensing, leaving only 18 industries subject to licensing. Industrial regulation was rationalised.

National security, foreign policy and crisis management

Rao energised the national nuclear security and ballistic missiles programme, which ultimately resulted in the 1998 Pokhran nuclear tests. It is speculated that the tests were actually planned in 1995, during Rao's term in office, and that they were dropped under American pressure when the US intelligence got the whiff of it. Another view was that he purposefully leaked the information to gain time to develop and test thermonuclear device which was not yet ready. He increased military spending, and set the Indian Army on course to fight the emerging threat of terrorism and insurgencies, as well as Pakistan and China's nuclear potentials. It was during his term that khalistani terrorism in the Indian state of Punjab was finally defeated. Also scenarios of aircraft hijackings, which occurred during Rao's time ended without the government conceding the terrorists' demands. He also directed negotiations to secure the release of Doraiswamy, an Indian Oil executive, from Kashmiri terrorists who kidnapped him, and Liviu Radu, a Romanian diplomat posted in New Delhi in October 1991, who was kidnapped by Sikh terrorists. Rao also handled the Indian response to the occupation of the Hazratbal holy shrine in Jammu and Kashmir by terrorists in October 1993. He brought the occupation to an end without damage to the shrine. Similarly, he dealt with the kidnapping of some foreign tourists by a terrorist group called Al Faran in Kashmir valley in 1995 effectively. Although he could not secure the release of the hostages, his policies ensured that the terrorists demands were not conceded to, and that the action of the terrorists was condemned internationally, including Pakistan.

Rao also made diplomatic overtures to Western Europe, the United States, and China. He decided in 1992 to bring into the open India's relations with Israel, which had been kept covertly active for a few years during his tenure as a Foreign Minister, and permitted Israel to open an embassy in New Delhi. He ordered the intelligence community in 1992 to start a systematic drive to draw the international community's attention to Pakistan's sponsorship of terrorism against India and not to be discouraged by US efforts to undermine the exercise. Rao launched the Look East foreign policy, which brought India closer to ASEAN. According to Rejaul Karim Laskar, a scholar of India's foreign policy and ideologue of Rao's Congress Party, Rao initiated the Look East policy with three objectives in mind, namely, to renew political contacts with the ASEAN-member nation; to increase economic interaction with South East Asia in trade, investment, science and technology, tourism, etc.; and to forge strategic and defence links with several countries of South East Asia. He decided to maintain a distance from the Dalai Lama in order to avoid aggravating Beijing's suspicions and concerns, and made successful overtures to Tehran. The 'cultivate Iran' policy was pushed through vigorously by him. These policies paid rich dividends for India in March 1994, when Benazir Bhutto's efforts to have a resolution passed by the UN Human Rights Commission in Geneva on the human rights situation in Jammu and Kashmir failed, with opposition by China and Iran.

Rao's crisis management after 12 March 1993 Bombay bombings was highly praised. He personally visited Bombay after the blasts and after seeing evidence of Pakistani involvement in the blasts, ordered the intelligence community to invite the intelligence agencies of the US, UK and other West European countries to send their counter-terrorism experts to Bombay to examine the facts for themselves.

Economic crisis and initiation of liberalisation
Rao decided that India, which in 1991 was on the brink of bankruptcy, would benefit from liberalising its economy. He appointed economist Manmohan Singh, a former governor of the Reserve Bank of India, as Finance Minister to accomplish his goals. This liberalisation was criticised by many socialist nationalists at that time.
 
He is often referred as 'Father of Indian Economic Reforms'. PV Narasimha Rao: The 10th Prime Minister who changed the face of Indian economy under Rao's mandate and leadership, then finance minister Manmohan Singh launched a series of pro-globalisation reforms, including International Monetary Fund (IMF) policies, to rescue the almost-bankrupt nation from economic collapse.

Father of Indian nuclear programme 
Kalam recalls that Rao ordered him not to test, since "the election result was quite different from what he anticipated". The BJP's Atal Bihari Vajpayee took over as prime minister on 16 May 1996. Narasimha Rao, Abdul Kalam and R Chidambaram went to meet the new prime minister "so that", in Kalam's telling, "the smooth takeover of such a very important programme can take place".

Rao knew he had only one chance to test before sanctions kicked in, i.e., he could not both test conventional atomic bombs in December 1995 as well as the hydrogen bomb separately in April 1996. As Shekhar Gupta – who has had unprecedented access to Rao as well as the nuclear team – speculates: "By late 1995, Rao's scientists told him that they needed six more months. They could test some weapons but not others...thermonuclear etc. So Rao began a charade of taking preliminary steps to test, without intending to test then."

National elections were scheduled for May 1996, and Rao spent the next two months campaigning. On 8 May at 21:00, Abdul Kalam was asked to immediately meet with the prime minister. Rao told him, "Kalam, be ready with the Department of Atomic Energy and your team for the N-test and I am going to Tirupati. You wait for my authorisation to go ahead with the test. DRDO-DAE teams must be ready for action."
Rao energised the national nuclear security and ballistic missiles programme. His efforts resulted in the 1998 Pokhran nuclear tests.

Rao was the "true father" of India's nuclear programme. Vajpayee said that, in May 1996, a few days after he had succeeded Rao as prime minister, "Rao told me that the bomb was ready. I only exploded it."

"Saamagri tayyar hai," Rao had said. ("The ingredients are ready.") "You can go ahead."
The conventional narrative at the time was that prime minister Rao had wanted to test nuclear weapons in December 1995. The Americans had caught on, and Rao had dithered – as was his wont. Three years later, prime minister Atal Bihari Vajpayee fulfilled his party's campaign promise by ordering five nuclear tests below the shimmering sands of Rajasthan.

Handling of separatist movements

Rao successfully decimated the Sikh separatist movement and neutralised Kashmiri separatist movement to cetain extent. It is said that Rao was 'solely responsible' for the decision to hold elections in Punjab, no matter how narrow the electorate base would be. In dealing with Kashmir Rao's government was highly restrained by US government and its president Bill Clinton. Rao's government introduced the Terrorist and Disruptive Activities (Prevention) Act (TADA), India's first anti-terrorism legislation, and directed the Indian Army to eliminate the infiltrators from Pakistan. Despite a heavy and largely successful Army campaign, Pakistani Media accuses that the state descended into a security nightmare. Tourism and commerce were also largely disrupted.

Babri Mosque riots

In the late 1980s, the Bharatiya Janata Party (BJP) brought the Ram Janmabhoomi issue to the centre stage of national politics, and the BJP and VHP began organising larger protests in Ayodhya and around the country.

Members of the Vishva Hindu Parishad (VHP) demolished the Babri Mosque (which was constructed by Mir Baqi, a general of India's first Mughal Emperor, Babur) in Ayodhya on 6 December 1992. The site is believed to be the birthplace of the Hindu god Rama. The destruction of the disputed structure, which was widely reported in the international media, unleashed large scale communal violence, the most extensive since the Partition of India. Hindus and Muslims were indulged in massive rioting across the country, and almost every major city including Delhi, Mumbai, Kolkata, Ahmedabad, Hyderabad, Bhopal struggled to control the unrest.

Later Liberhan Commission, after extensive hearing and investigation, exonerated P. V. Narasimha Rao. It pointed out that Rao was heading a minority government, the Commission accepted the centre's submission that central forces could neither be deployed by the Union in the totality of facts and circumstances then prevailing, nor could President's Rule be imposed "on the basis of rumours or media reports". Taking such a step would have created "bad precedent" damaging the federal structure and would have "amounted to interference" in the state administration, it said. The state "deliberately and consciously understated" the risk to the disputed structure and general law and order. It also said that the Governor's assessment of the situation was either badly flawed or overly optimistic and was thus a major impediment for the central government. The Commission further said, "... knowing fully well that its facetious undertakings before the Supreme Court had bought it sufficient breathing space, it (state government) proceeded with the planning for the destruction of the disputed structure. The Supreme Court's own observer failed to alert it to the sinister undercurrents. The Governor and its intelligence agencies, charged with acting as the eyes and ears of the central government also failed in their task. Without substantive procedural prerequisites, neither the Supreme Court, nor the Union of India was able to take any meaningful steps."

In yet another discussion with journalist Shekhar Gupta, Rao answered several of the questions on the demolition. He said he was wary of the impact of hundreds of deaths on the nation, and it could have been far worse. And also he had to consider the scenario in which some of the troops might have turned around and joined the mobs instead. Regarding dismissal of Kalyan Singh (government), he said, "mere dismissal does not mean you can take control. It takes a day or so appointing advisers, sending them to Lucknow, taking control of the state. Meanwhile, what had to happen would have happened and there would have been no Kalyan Singh to blame either."

Latur earthquake

In 1993, a strong earthquake in Latur, Maharashtra killed nearly 10,000 people and displaced hundreds of thousands. Rao was applauded by many for using modern technology and resources to organise major relief operations to assuage the stricken people, and for schemes of economic reconstruction.

Purulia arms drop case

Narasimha Rao was charged for his facilitating safe exit of accused of 1995 Purulia arms drop case. Although, it was never proved.

Corruption charges and acquittal
In the early 1990s, one of the earliest accusations came in the form of stockbroker Harshad Mehta, who through his lawyer, Ram Jethmalani, revealed that he had paid a sum of one crore rupees to the then prime minister Rao for help in closing his cases.

Rao's government faced a no-confidence motion in July 1993, because the opposition felt that it did not have sufficient numbers to prove a majority. It was alleged that Rao, through a representative, offered millions of rupees to members of the Jharkhand Mukti Morcha (JMM), and possibly a breakaway faction of the Janata Dal, to vote for him during the confidence motion. Shailendra Mahato, one of those members who had accepted the bribe, turned approver. In 1996, after Rao's term in office had expired, investigations began in earnest in the case. In 2000, after years of legal proceedings, a special court convicted Rao and his colleague, Buta Singh (who is alleged to have escorted the MPs to the Prime Minister). Rao was sentenced to three years in prison for corruption. "I sentence the accused PV Narasimha Rao and Buta Singh to rigorous imprisonment up to three years and a fine of 100,000 rupees ($2,150)," the judge said in his order. Rao appealed to the Delhi High Court and remained free on bail. In 2002, the Delhi High Court overturned the lower court's decision mainly due to the doubt in credibility of Mahato's statements (which were extremely inconsistent) and both Rao and Buta Singh were cleared of the charges.

Rao, along with fellow minister K. K. Tewary, Chandraswami and K. N. Aggarwal, were accused of forging documents showing that Ajeya Singh had opened a bank account in the First Trust Corporation Bank in Saint Kitts and deposited $21 million in it, making his father V. P. Singh its beneficiary. The alleged intent was to tarnish V. P. Singh's image. This supposedly happened in 1989. However, only after Rao's term as PM had expired in 1996, was he formally charged by the Central Bureau of Investigation (CBI) for the crime. Less than a year later the court acquitted him due to lack of evidence linking him with the case.

Lakhubhai Pathak, an Indian businessman living in England, alleged that Chandraswami and K. N. Aggarwal alias Mamaji, along with Rao, cheated him out of $100,000. The amount was given for an express promise for allowing supplies of paper pulp in India, and Pathak alleged that he spent an additional $30,000 entertaining Chandraswami and his secretary. Narasimha Rao and Chandraswami were acquitted of the charges in 2003 and before his death, Rao was acquitted of all the cases charged against him.

Later life and financial difficulties
In spite of significant achievements in a difficult situation, in the 1996 general elections the Indian electorate voted out Rao's Congress Party. Soon, Sonia Gandhi's supporters forced Mr. Rao to step down as Party President. He was replaced by Sitaram Kesri.

Rao rarely spoke of his personal views and opinions during his 5-year tenure. After his retirement from national politics, he published a novel called The Insider. The book, which follows a man's rise through the ranks of Indian politics, resembled events from Rao's own life.

According to a vernacular source, despite holding many influential posts in Government, he faced many financial troubles. One of his sons was educated with the assistance of his son-in-law. He also faced trouble paying fees for a daughter who was studying medicine. According to P. V. R. K. Prasad, an Indian Administrative Service (IAS) officer who was Narasimha Rao's media advisor when the latter was Prime Minister, Rao asked his friends to sell away his house at Banjara Hills to clear the dues of lawyers.

Death

Rao suffered a heart attack on 9 December 2004, and was taken to the All India Institute of Medical Sciences where he died 14 days later at the age of 83. His family wanted the body cremated in Delhi. "This is his karmabhoomi", Rao's son Prabhakara told Manmohan Singh. But it is alleged that Sonia Gandhi's closest aide Ahmed Patel and others ensured that the body was moved to Hyderabad. In Delhi, his body was not allowed inside AICC building. His body was kept in state at the Jubilee Hall in Hyderabad. His funeral was attended by the Prime Minister of India Manmohan Singh, the Home Affairs Minister Shivraj Patil, the Bharatiya Janata Party (BJP) president L. K. Advani, the Defence Minister Pranab Mukherjee, the Finance Minister P. Chidambaram and many other dignitaries. Rao was a long-time widower, since his wife died in 1970 and he was survived by his eight children. The Government of Telangana declared his birthday to be celebrated as a Telangana State function in 2014. 10 years after his death, P. V. Narasimha Rao was accorded a memorial in Delhi at Ekta Sthal, which is now integrated with Rashtriya Smriti, a common place for erecting memorials for former Presidents, PMs and others. The memorial is raised on a plinth in marble bearing text highlighting briefly his contributions. The plaque describes Rao: "Known as the scholar Prime Minister of India, Shri P V Narasimha Rao was born on 28 June 1921 in Vangara, Karimnagar District in Telangana state. He rose to prominence as freedom fighter who fought the misrule of the Nizam during the formative years of his political career. A reformer, educationist, scholar, conversant in 15 languages and known for his intellectual contribution, he was called the ‘Brihaspati’ (wiseman) of Andhra Pradesh."

Personal life
In 1931, the 10-year-old Narasimha Rao was married to Satyamma, a girl of his own age, belonging to his own community and coming from a family of similar background. The marriage, which was arranged by their families in the usual Indian way, was entirely harmonious and it lasted all their lives. Smt. Satyamma died on 1 July 1970. 

The couple were blessed with three sons and five daughters. Their eldest son, P. V. Ranga Rao, was the education minister in Kotla Vijaya Bhaskara Reddy's cabinet and an MLA from Hanamakonda Assembly Constituency, in Warangal District for two terms. The second son, P. V. Rajeshwar Rao, was a Member of Parliament of the 11th Lok Sabha (15 May 1996 – 4 December 1997) from Secunderabad Lok Sabha constituency. The third son is P.V. Prabhakara Rao.

The five daughters of P.V. Narasimha Rao are Smt. N. Sharada Devi, wife of Sri N. Venkata Krishna Rao; Smt. K. Saraswathi Devi, wife of Dr. K. Sarath Chandra Rao; Smt. S. Vani Devi, wife of Sri S. Divakara Rao; Smt. Vijaya Somayaji, wife of Sri Ramakrishna Somayaji; and Smt. K. Jaya Devi, wife of Sri K. Revathi Nandan.

Legacy

Biographical and political evaluation
On the occasion of 25 years of economic liberalisation in India, there have been several books published by authors, journalists and civil servants evaluating Rao's contributions. While Vinay Sitapati's book Half Lion: How P.V. Narasimha Rao transformed India (2016) gives a renewed biographical picture of his entire life, Sanjay Baru's book 1991: How P V Narasimha Rao made history (2016) and Jairam Ramesh's book From the brink to back: India's 1991 story (2015) focusses on his role in unleashing the reforms in the year 1991 as the Prime Minister of India.

Literary achievements
Rao's mother tongue was Telugu, and he had an excellent command of Marathi. In addition to eight other Indian languages (Hindi, Oriya, Bengali, Gujarati, Kannada, Sanskrit, Tamil and Urdu), he spoke English, French, Arabic, Spanish, German and Persian. He was able to speak 17 languages. Due to his college education in Fergusson College in Pune, then an affiliated college of the University of Mumbai (but now with Pune University), he became a very prolific reader and speaker of Marathi. He translated the great Telugu literary work Veyipadagalu of Kavi Samraat Viswanatha Satyanarayana into Hindi as Sahasraphan. He also translated Hari Narayan Apte's Marathi novel Pan Lakshat Kon Gheto (But Who Pays Attention?) into Telugu. He was also invited to be the chief guest of Akhil Bhartiya Marathi Sahitya Sanmelan where he gave speech in Marathi.

In his later life he wrote his autobiography, The Insider, which depicts his experiences in politics.

"Sonia Gandhi praised contributions of all Congress prime ministers except P V Narasimha Rao in her speech ... Making no mention of Rao in her 15-minute speech, she said Rajiv Gandhi scripted the course of economic policies that were followed by the government (headed by Rao) for the following five years."

"Even today, the Congress leadership shows extreme reluctance to acknowledge the role PV Narasimha Rao played in appointing Manmohan Singh as his finance minister and giving him the freedom to unveil the economic reforms package to bail the Indian economy out of an unprecedented crisis. The Congress leadership was correct in blaming Narasimha Rao for his political misjudgment on the Ayodhya issue. But it is now time the same leadership also acknowledged Narasimha Rao's role in ushering in economic reforms."

Centenary celebrations
In June 2020, Government of Telangana, led by Telangana Rashtra Samithi has declared to organise one-year long centenary celebrations of Rao. The state government also decided to set up a memorial and five bronze statues at various places, including Hyderabad, Warangal, Karimnagar, Vangara and Delhi.

In popular culture 
In the year 2019, an independent biographical documentary film named P V: Change with Continuity (2019) directed and produced by Sravani Kotha and Srikar Reddy Gopaladinne released on the streaming platform Vimeo. The documentary features rare archival footage and interviews of several distinguished people closely related to Rao's life and work.

Suresh Kumar appeared as Rao in the 2019 film NTR: Mahanayakudu directed by Krish which chart the life of the Indian actor-politician N. T. Rama Rao. The same year, Ajit Satbhai portrayed Rao as the former Prime Minister of India in the film The Accidental Prime Minister by Vijay Gutte, about Manmohan Singh.

Pradhanmantri, a 2013 Indian docudrama television series which aired on ABP News and covers the various policies and political tenures of Indian PMs, based the twentieth episode - "P. V. Narasimha Rao and Corruption charges against him" - on his term as the country's leader; Ravi Jhankal portrayed the role of Rao.

Awards
Rao was awarded the Pratibha Murthy Lifetime Achievement Award. Many people across the party line supported the name of P. V. Narasimha Rao for Bharat Ratna. Telangana Chief Minister K. Chandrashekhar Rao supported the move to give Bharat Ratna to Rao. BJP leader Subramanian Swamy supported the move to give Bharat Ratna to Rao. According to Sanjay Baru, PM Manmohan Singh wanted to give Bharat Ratna to Rao during his tenure but failed.

In September 2020, Telangana Legislative Assembly adopted a resolution seeking to confer Bharat Ratna on Rao. The resolution also requested the Central Government to rename the University of Hyderabad after him.

See also
 1993 Bombay bombings
 Demolition of the Babri Masjid
 1993 Latur earthquake
 The Insider (Rao novel)

References

Citations

Sources

Further reading
 The Quest For Peace with Kotha Satchidananda Murthy (1986)
 The Great Suicide written pseudonymously (1990) 
 India and the Asia-Pacific: Forging a New Relationship (1994)
 The Insider (1998)
 A Long Way: Selected Speeches (2002)
 Ayodhya 6 December 1992 published posthumously (2006)
 Half - Lion: How P.V Narasimha Rao Transformed India by Vinay Sitapati (2016), Retitled in 2018 when released by Oxford University Press as The Man Who Remade India: A Biography of P.V. Narasimha Rao by Vinay Sitapathi
 1991: How P.V. Narasimha Rao Made History by Sanjaya Baru (2016)
 Narasimha Rao: Unsung Hero by Krishna Mohan Sharma (2017)
 
 Shukla, Subhash. "Foreign Policy Of India Under Narasimha Rao Government" (PhD dissertation, U of Allahabad, 1999)  online free, bibliography pp 488–523.
 Singh, Sangeeta. "Trends in India's Foreign Policy: 1991-2009." (PhD dissertation, Aligarh Muslim University, 2016) online

External links

 
 

 

 
1921 births
2004 deaths
Prime Ministers of India
Union Ministers from Telangana
Chief Ministers of Andhra Pradesh
Founders of Indian schools and colleges
Indian National Congress politicians from Andhra Pradesh
Indian Hindus
People from Karimnagar
Presidents of the Indian National Congress
Rao administration
Rashtrasant Tukadoji Maharaj Nagpur University alumni
University of Mumbai alumni
India MPs 1977–1979
India MPs 1980–1984
India MPs 1984–1989
India MPs 1989–1991
India MPs 1991–1996
India MPs 1996–1997
Indian male novelists
20th-century Indian novelists
20th-century Indian lawyers
Lok Sabha members from Maharashtra
Lok Sabha members from Andhra Pradesh
Lok Sabha members from Odisha
Osmania University alumni
Chief ministers from Indian National Congress
Fergusson College alumni
Heads of government who were later imprisoned
Defence Ministers of India
Law Ministers of India
Education Ministers of India
Ministers for External Affairs of India
Ministers of Internal Affairs of India
Commerce and Industry Ministers of India
20th-century prime ministers of India
Members of the Cabinet of India
Health ministers of India
Indian independence activists from Telangana
People from Hanamkonda district
Telugu politicians
Telugu–Hindi translators
Assassination of Rajiv Gandhi